"Par amour, par pitié" is a song by Sylvie Vartan. It was released on an EP in December 1966 and then on her 1967 album 2'35 de bonheur.

Composition 

Commercial performance 
The song reached the top 10 in France (according to the charts published by the U.S. magazine Billboard in its "Hits of the World" section) and number two in Wallonia (French Belgium).

Track listing 
7-inch EP RCA 86187 M (1966 or early 1967, France etc.)
 A1. "Par amour, par pitié" (3:06)
 A2. "Noël sans toi" (2:53)
 B1. "Quand un amour renaît" (2:31)
 B2. 'Garde-moi dans ta poche" (2:27)

Charts

Cover versions 
The song was covered by Valérie Lemercier on her 2009 album Madame Aime.

References 

 Sylvie Vartan – "La plus belle pour aller danser" (EP) at Discogs

1966 songs
1966 singles
French songs
Sylvie Vartan songs
RCA Victor singles
Songs written by Jean Renard (songwriter)
Songs written by Gilles Thibaut